Gerry Cranham (born 1929) is an English former sports photographer.

Early life

Cranham was born in Hampshire, England.

Career

Crantham was a promising middle-distance runner, but stopped due to injury. After that, he became a sports photographer, establishing himself as one of the pioneering sports photographers of the twentieth century.

References

1929 births
Living people
Sports photographers